This is a list of programmes broadcast by E City in 2013. Variety specials and encore timeslots will not be shown on this list.

7.00pm soap opera 戏剧7点档
These dramas air in Singapore from 7:00pm to 8:00pm, Monday to Friday on E City.

Teens 四角酷

Drama
These dramas air in Singapore from 10:00pm to 11:00pm, Monday to Friday on E City.

Entertainment
These shows air in Singapore from 11:00pm to 12:00am, Monday to Friday on E City.

Anime
These Japanese anime shows air in Singapore from 12:00am to 12:30am, Monday to Friday on E City.

Kids 小绿豆
These shows air in Singapore from 10:30am to 12:30pm, Monday to Friday on E City. There will be no repeats.

Idol dramas (Taiwan) 都会偶像剧

Saturdays
These idol dramas air in Singapore from 8:00pm to 9:30pm, Saturdays on E City.

Sundays
These idol dramas air in Singapore from 10:00pm to 11.45pm, Sundays on E City.

Idol dramas (Korea) JK剧场
These idol dramas air in Singapore from 10:30pm to 12.45am, Saturdays on E City, 2 episodes back-to-back.

Entertainment @ 8 娱乐8点档
These shows air in Singapore from 8:00pm to 10:00pm on E City.

See also
E City

External links
 Starhub CableTV programme guide

2010s Singaporean television series
E City
Singaporean television series